Alden Central School District is a school district in Alden, New York, United States. The superintendent is Adam Stoltman. The district operates four schools: Alden High School, Alden Middle School, Alden Intermediate School, and Alden Primary School.

Office Location 
The district offices are located at 13190 Park Street. The current superintendent is Alden Alumnus, Mr. Adam Stoltman.

Current administrators 
Mr. Adam Stoltman; Superintendent of Schools
Ms. Sharon Hance; Director of Student and Staff Learning
Mr. Frank Rizzo; Director of Instructional and Information Technology/CIO
Mr. Paul Karpik; School Business Administrator
Mrs. Debbie Hoffman; Supervisor of Transportation
Mr. Robert McCormick; Supervisor of Buildings and Grounds
Ms. Reanna Lizauckas; District School Lunch Manager
Ms. Nancy Rusinski; Erie County Correctional Facility Educational Program Director
Mr. William MacCowan, Director of Physical Education
Mr. Ken Partell and Mrs. Sandy Gauthier; Co-Directors of Athletics

Selected Former Superintendents 
Previous Assignment and Reason for Departure denoted in parentheses
Mr. Thomas Boedicker–1986-1997 (unknown, named Superintendent of West Islip City School District)
Dr. Merton L. Haynes [Interim]April- August 1997 (Interim Superintendent - West Seneca Central School District, named Interim Superintendent of Depew Union Free School District)
Dr. Donald W. Raw Jr.;1997-2001 (Superintendent - military leave 2001-2002)
Mrs. Margaret A. Ryan (Interim);2001-2002 (Principal - Alden Primary School, retired)
Dr. Donald W. Raw Jr.;2002-2006 (Superintendent on Leave - Alden Central Schools, named Superintendent of Canandaigua City School District)
Dr. Lynn M. Fusco–2006-2013 (Director of Curriculum & Instruction - East Aurora Union Free School District, named Superintendent of Niagara-Wheatfield Central School District)

Alden High School 

Alden Senior High School is located at 13190 Park Street and serves grades 9 through 12. The current principal is Mr. Kevin Ryan, and the current assistant principal is Mr. William MacCowan.

History 
Alden High School opened in 1967.

In 2011 and 2012, Alden's football team was Class B Champions in Section VI, and was ranked 2nd in the state by maxpreps.com.

Selected former principals 
Previous assignment and reason for departure denoted in parentheses
Mr. William Tupay–1979-1995 (Vice Principal - Alden High School, retired)
Mr. Timothy M. Shannon–1995-2005 (Assistant Principal - Buffalo Traditional School, retired)

Former Assistant Principals 
Previous assignment and reason for departure denoted in parentheses
Mr. William Tupay–1977-1979 (Social Studies Teacher - Alden High School named Principal of Alden High School)
Mr. Warren F. Crouse–1979-1984 (English teacher - East Aurora High School, named Principal of Holland Middle School)
Mr. Charles W. Brenner–1984-2007 (Physical Education Teacher/Director of Athletics - Pembroke High School, retired)
Mr. William MacCowan–2007-2013 (Physical Education Teacher - Alden High School, named Interim Principal of Alden Middle School)
Mrs. Melanie Monacelli [interim]– 2013-2014 (Assistant Principal - Alden Middle School, returned to position)

Former Directors of Athletics 
Previous assignment and reason for departure denoted in parentheses
Mr. Harrison Hill 1975-1995, retired
Mr. Thomas Cowan, 1995-1999, retired
Mr. Adam Stoltman, 1999-2002, named Principal of Akron Intermediate School
Mr. David Kratzke, 2002-2005
Mrs. Amy D'Amato, 2005-2007
Mr. Kevin Davenport, 2007-2009, resigned
Mr. Charles Brenner, 2009-2010, retired
Mr. Kevin Ryan & Mr. William MacCowan, 2013-2014
Mr. Matthew Librock, 2014- March 2016 (became Director Health, PE, and Athletics of the East Aurora UFSD)
Mr. Robert Delzer, Interim Director, March 2016-June 2016
Mr. Daniel Kaplan, 2016-2017, resigned
Mr. Ken Partell & Mrs. Sandy Gauthier, 2017–Present

Alden Middle School 

Alden Middle School is located at 13250 Park Street and serves grades 6 through 8. The current principal is Mr. Steven Smith.

History 
Alden Middle School opened in 1960 as an extension of the 1914/1936/1951 complex on Crittenden Road. It operated for many years as a 6-8 school. Due to district consolidation in 2011, the school expanded to Grades 4-8 and merged with the Intermediate School. The schools split and returned to their prior states in 2016.

Former principals 
Previous assignment and reason for departure denoted in parentheses
Mr. George F. McCormick–1979-December 1992 (Retired)
Mr. Alfred L. Feeney–Interim (January–March 1993)
Mr. William Tupay–Interim Principal Grades 6-12(April 1993)
Mr. Emil T. Wozniak–May 1993-August 1993 (Assistant Principal - Akron High School, resigned)
Mrs. Francine L. Fritz–1993-2002, Summer 2004 (Assistant Principal - West Seneca East High School, retired)
Mr. Jeffrey A. Faunce–2002-2004 (Assistant Principal - Edward Town Middle School, resigned)
Mr. Adam Stoltman–2004-2013 (Principal - Akron Intermediate School, named Interim Superintendent of Alden Central Schools)
Mr. William MacCowan–2013-2014 (Assistant Principal - Alden High School, returned to position)

Alden Intermediate School 

Alden Intermediate School is located at 1648 Crittenden Road and educates students in Grades 3 through 5. The current principal is Alden Alumnus, Mr. John Mikulski.

History 
The district closed Alden Elementary in 1997 to rename it, Alden Intermediate School, serving grades 3-5. The district consolidated during the summer of 2011, and the third grade was moved to the Primary School at Townline Elementary. Grades four and five were consolidated into the Middle School. At the November 2015 Board of Education meeting, due to the increased population at Alden Primary, the Board voted to reopen Alden Intermediate School in September 2016. The building first opened in 1936, and additions were put on in 1951 and 1960.

Selected former principals 
Mr. Samuel F. Trippe, 1949-1977 (Retired) 
Mr. Thomas Lyons, 1988-2011, (named Principal of Alden Primary School at Townline)
Mrs. Melanie Monacelli, July–December 2016, (Retired)

Alden Primary School 

Alden Primary School at Townline is located at 11197 Broadway and serves grades K through 2. The current principal is Mr. Michael Stepnick.

History 
The school, originally named Townline Elementary School, opened in 1960 and housed grades K-5 until 1997, when it was turned into the district Primary School, grades K-2. In the summer of 2011, the district consolidated and brought third grade over from the Intermediate campus. The third grade returned to the Intermediate School in 2016.

Selected former principals 
Mr. Walter Hay–?-1988 (Physical Education teacher - Alden Central Schools, retired)
Mrs. Margaret A. Ryan–1988-2001 (Teacher - Townline Elementary School, retired)
Mrs. Melanie L. Monacelli–2001-2011 (Principal - Forestville Elementary School, named Assistant Principal of Alden Middle School)
Mr. Thomas J. Lyons; 2011-2018, retired after 30 years working as a Principal in the Alden Central School District.

Selected former administrators

 
* Denotes interim appointment

Defunct schools

Millgrove Elementary School 
Millgrove Elementary opened in 1963, and closed in the 1980s. It was purchased by the Town of Alden, and houses the Town's administrative offices. It first opened in 1927 in the Old Millgrove building on Genesee Street housing grades K-6.

References

External links
Official site

Education in Erie County, New York
School districts in New York (state)